Sergey Sergeyevich Lapochkin (born 28 April 1981) is a Russian former professional football referee.

He has been a FIFA referee since 2013.

His father, also named Sergey Lapochkin also was a referee.

On 9 June 2021, it was announced that he is banned from any football activity for 10 years by UEFA. In July 2018 he was contacted by unidentified people who wanted him to influence the outcome of the Europa League qualifier between Ventspils and Bordeaux that he was refereeing, and he did not report this contact to UEFA.

References

External links 
 
 

1981 births
Living people
Russian football referees
Herzen University alumni